Eko Software is a French video game developer located in the Choisy-le-roi suburb of Paris. The company was established in 1999 by Jules-Benjamin Lalisse.

In 2018, Bigben Interactive (now Nacon) acquired the company for an estimated €8.5 million.

Games

References 

French companies established in 1999
Video game companies established in 1999
Video game companies of France
Companies based in Île-de-France
Val-de-Marne
2018 mergers and acquisitions
Nacon